The Dutchess County Department Of Emergency Response has the responsibility of governing Emergency operations in Dutchess County, New York. This encompasses Police, Fire and EMS.

Dispatch system
The Dutchess County (DC) Fire and EMS radio system has 16 channels, comprising 9 UHF frequencies, that uses continuous tone coded squelch system (CTCSS) to eliminate outside interference, and Radio repeater base stations to enhance and extend the mobile communications. The 16 channels are divided into five main categories; Dispatch, Response, Command, Firegrounds & Field Operations. Individual agencies and departments can request their own frequency utilizing the UHF band.

Dispatch, Response, Command and Field Operations have repeater sites at Clove Tower (Union Vale), Illinois Mountain Tower (Highland), Silver Mountain Tower (Town of North East), Hosner Mountain Tower (East Fishkill), Depot Hill Tower (Beekman/Poughquag) and Woody Row Tower (formerly Milan Tower in Milan). Beginning on December 1, 2008; Dutchess 911 began simulcasting their Fire/EMS Dispatch channel on all towers allowing a call that's dispatched to be heard equally in all areas of the county, without any audio loss.

Firegrounds, which are used for multi-agency coordination and can be requested by a Fire Chief or a County Deputy Fire Coordinator (County Car). The Fireground channels utilize a combination of paired repeater, and simplex (talkaround) channels, which are commonly used at Structure Fire's, Auto Accident's and MCI's.

Unit identifiers
All Fire Departments in Dutchess County are issued an Agency Number (based on department name alphabetically), followed by the apparatus number. For the second set of numbers, different number ranges signify different types of apparatus. For instance, 11-19 is a Fire Engine. 21-29 is also a Fire Engine. 31-39 are Tankers (aka water tenders). There are other apparatus types with numbers ranging up to 99, however not all are listed here in this article.

Example, agency code number 32, would mean that it is Arlington, and then 45 means the apparatus is a Ladder. The final product looks like this: 32-45

EMS providers formerly utilized a similar numerical designation system as mentioned above for Fire Departments, but the number of ALS and BLS units present in the county exceeded the limits set forth in the numbering system, and transitioned into an Agency Name (i.e. NDP, TransCare, etc.), Unit Type (ALS Ambulance {Medic Unit}, BLS Ambulance, ALS Flycar), and Unit Number. As an example, Mobile Life Support Services uses numbers in the 200 range, and would call out as "Mobile Life Medic 2xx". TransCare uses a similar format, however they have a much greater range of numbers. Beacon Volunteer Ambulance Corps (BVAC) and NDP EMS are the only EMS Agencies in Dutchess County that are still officially assigned numbers such as those for the Fire Departments, such as Beacon Volunteer 82-72 (82 is the Agency ID and numbers in the 70's range signifies a BLS unit) or 82-89 (82 is the Agency ID and numbers in the 80's range signifies an ALS unit).

Fire and EMS agencies use the 4 digit number system mentioned above, whereas some Police use their agency name rather than a department or agency code. For example, Town of Hyde Park Police are referred to as "Hyde Park Car xx". The Dutchess County Sheriff would use an identifier of "DC69", the DC stands for Dutchess County, and the 69 represents the unit number.

The New York State Police use a variety of identifiers, such as 1Kxx, 2Kxx, 7Kxxx as well as others. The first number identifies which zone they are based out of. The 'K' represents that the unit's main reporting Troop.

Divisions
Dutchess County has numerous county-wide divisions which can respond to handle a wide array of instances;
Communications Division - This division comprises all communications equipment and systems that are used to receive 911 wire line and wireless calls. The 911 Communications Center dispatches Police, EMS and Fire units and communicates with these units throughout emergencies. There is continuous maintenance, updating and upgrading of all systems to ensure that the best possible communications system is available for those we service. The operation of the 911 Center and the entire infrastructure is the responsibility of this division. The 911 Communications Center operates 24 hours a day, 7 days a week.
Critical Incident Stress Management Team -this team is a group of highly trained volunteers who are supplemented by the Dutchess County Department of Mental Hygiene’s Trauma Team. This team is available directly to fire districts, EMS agencies and Police departments in Dutchess County. The team is used for counseling and consoling First Responders who may be faced with horrific or extremely infrequent incidents. The team may respond directly to the scene, or they may respond to the station where they hold a diffusing and debriefing session where first responders can make their thoughts known. When members call out responding they use the identifier CT-x
Emergency Management - As required by the New York State Defense Emergency Act adopted in 1951, every county or city is mandated to establish a civil defense organization and the New York State Executive Law, Article 2-B of 1980 authorizes the established Office of Emergency Management to plan and prepare for natural and man-made disasters. The “parent” agency is the New York State Emergency Management Office (SEMO), which is the conduit for Dutchess County to the Federal Emergency Management Agency (FEMA).The federal concept, which is adopted throughout the nation, is the Integrated Emergency Management System. This system is FEMA’s implementation of the Comprehensive Emergency Management Concept, which is in place in Dutchess County. The primary function of this division is to develop and maintain a comprehensive emergency management capability in cooperation with other governmental agencies and the private sector.
EMS Division - Not necessarily a complete team, in contrast with the rest of the divisions, but as a county, if summoned, the Dispatch Center can mobilize every department in a single dispatch to relocate or respond to incidents that may happen around the state. For instance, on September 11, 2001 Dutchess County ambulances were relocated to New York City to help backfill for departments in the city, whose resources were spread thin. During the Blackout of 2003 ambulances were dispatched to New York City to provide services for residents.
Fire Investigation Division - This team is a group of volunteer fire investigators which are dispatched to all vehicle or structure fires where arson or foul play is suspected. Their headquarters is at the Dutchess County Department of Emergency Response Dispatch Center in Hyde Park, New York. Their identifier, in which members use to call out is FID-x.
Fire and Rescue - The seven (7) deputy coordinators are assigned to seven individual response areas known as “Battalions”. At the requests of the Fire Coordinator or Fire Chief, Deputy Coordinators who respond to mutual aid events and assist in providing mutual aid assistance and other resources as required. They provide advice and council as required; ensure the use of Incident Command and unity command at incidents; and work closely with Fire Chiefs (Incident Commanders) in ensuring life safety priorities and integrity of the emergency scene and resources. The overall goal is to maintain preservation of the Dutchess County Mutual Aid Plan.  The Deputy Coordinators also work with local governmental agencies in developing disaster plans at the local level and assist with pre-planning activities and exercising these plans. They meet regularly with the fire chiefs to facilitate open communications as well as interface with the 911 Communications Center. They also represent the County Coordinator at the local level. This division coordinates resources to be sent throughout New York State per the New York State Fire Mobilization and Mutual Aid Plan which Dutchess County is enrolled in. Fire apparatus and firefighters have been frequently sent to the northern portions of the state to assist during ice storms that paralyzed that region. Dutchess County is frequently put on standby notice for large-scale emergencies that occur throughout our state.  Members of the Fire and Rescue Division are on call 24 hours a day. The members of this division are volunteer deputy fire coordinators.
Fire Police Response Team - A team which is available to fire districts that may have a shortage of Fire Police, or may be operating at a scene for a lengthy period of time. They provide scene safety, crowd control, traffic control and scene integrity. Fire Police are sworn Peace Officers in the State of New York. When dispatched members call out responding using RT-x
Fire Prevention and Public Education - The Fire Prevention/Public Safety Division members come from Fire and EMS agencies throughout Dutchess County and join as a group to provide fire safety and injury prevention education to the people of Dutchess County. Membership is open to any volunteer and/or career members from any of the Fire or EMS services within Dutchess County.  This division maintains a library of videotapes, handouts and various props to be loaned to local groups conducting fire prevention education activities. Division members may also come to the local educational events and provide support.  The division has specialized equipment, which is a small robot in the form of a fire hydrant, and a commercial Fire Safety Trailer donated by the Dyson Foundation. These are available for use upon request, but a special certification of operators are needed.  This group is especially busy during Fire Prevention Week each October and several weeks prior and after. 
Hazardous Materials Division - Dutchess County has a truck, manned by volunteer personnel which can be called to a Haz-Mat scene where fire department apparatus is not sufficient. A Chief places a call to county, requesting the truck and crew, and then they are dispatched. The truck is housed at the Communications Center in the Town Of Hyde Park. Members identifiers used for dispatching is HM-x
Medical Reserve Corps (MRC) - MRC Volunteers help prepare for and respond to emergencies by adding to the existing local emergency and public health resources.  MRC Volunteers are office workers, interpreters, chaplains, legal advisors, and so on.  MRC Volunteers are medical and public health professionals such as physicians, nurses, pharmacists, dentists, veterinarians, and epidemiologists.  An MRC Volunteer is able to: Assist local hospitals and health departments with surge personnel needs, Participate in mass prophylaxis and vaccination and community disaster drills and Train with local emergency response partners
Training - A Deputy Coordinator is assigned the duties of the Training Administrator. The Training Administrator works with the Battalion Coordinators and schedules NYS Fire Academy Outreach Courses in the local fire stations per the needs of the Fire Chief. With five New York State Fire Instructors assigned to Dutchess County, the Training Administrator coordinates the State Fire Instructors in providing basic to advanced firefighter classes including fire officer management. Traditionally, Dutchess County has provided between 1200 and 1500 training hours each year, both in classroom and practical evolutions at the Fire Training Center.  Dutchess County maintains a Fire Training Academy at 392 Creek Road. Classrooms and several training evolutions such as a training tower, two story live burn facility, mask confidence course, firefighter survival simulator, confined space training simulator and propane fire simulator, as well as, vehicle pads to practice extrication. Any fire department, police or EMS agency that has certified instructors may register to use these facilities.

Departments

See also

Police
Fire Department
Emergency Medical Services

References

External links
Emergency Response Home
Dutchess County Sheriff's Office

County government agencies in New York (state)
Dutchess County, New York